Daniel Pek (born 28 November 1991) is a Paralympic athlete from Poland who competes in T20 classification middle-distance running events. Pek represented Poland at the 2012 Summer Paralympics in London, where he won silver in the 1500 m race. He has also finished on the podium at both World and European Championships, winning the gold medal at the 2016 European Championship in Grosseto in his favoured 1,500m event.

References 

Paralympic athletes of Poland
Athletes (track and field) at the 2012 Summer Paralympics
Paralympic silver medalists for Poland
Living people
1991 births
Polish male middle-distance runners
Medalists at the 2012 Summer Paralympics
People from Kościerzyna
Paralympic medalists in athletics (track and field)
Athletes (track and field) at the 2020 Summer Paralympics
21st-century Polish people
20th-century Polish people